Shaun or Sean Davies may refer to:

Shaun Davies (activist), an Aboriginal language activist and linguist
Shaun Davies (rugby union), an American rugby union player and coach
Sean Davies (footballer), an English footballer
Sean Davies, a Zimbabwean cricketer
Sean Davies, protagonist in the Runaway TV serial

See also
Sean Davis (disambiguation)